Long Creek is an unincorporated community and census-designated place (CDP) in western Oconee County, South Carolina, United States. It was first listed as a CDP in the 2020 census with a population of 96.

It is located within the Sumter National Forest and is the location of the Long Creek Academy, which is on the National Register of Historic Places. Long Creek is between Westminster and the Georgia state line.

Demographics

2020 census

Note: the US Census treats Hispanic/Latino as an ethnic category. This table excludes Latinos from the racial categories and assigns them to a separate category. Hispanics/Latinos can be of any race.

References

Sumter National Forest
Census-designated places in Oconee County, South Carolina
Census-designated places in South Carolina